Rahel may refer to:

 Rachel, a biblical figure
 Rahel Varnhagen (1771–1833), German Jewish author and salonniere, often referred to by her first name alone